Bradlee Joseph Ioane Anae (born January 17, 1998) is an American football defensive end for the New York Jets of the National Football League (NFL). He played college football at Utah.

Early years
Anae grew up in Laie, Hawaii and attended Kahuku High & Intermediate School, where he was a member of the basketball, football, and track teams. As a senior, he contributed to the school earning a 13-0 record and winning the Division 1 state title. He received All-state and second-team All-USA Hawaii honors.

Rated a three-star recruit, Anae committed to play college football at the University of Utah over offers from Vanderbilt and BYU. He followed his older sister Adora, who was a volleyball scholar athlete at the school.

College career
Anae played in six games for Utah as a true freshman defensive end backup, recording four tackles and two sacks. He started 9 games at right defensive end and one at defensive tackle for the Utes during his sophomore year, registering 39 total tackles, 3 forced fumbles, with a team-leading 7.0 sacks and tying for the team lead with 10.0 tackles for loss.

As a junior, he started all 14 games (the last 11 at right defensive end). He led the Pac-12 Conference with 8.0 sacks and finished third in the conference with 15.5 tackles for loss along with 51 total tackles (fifth on the team), three passes broken up, 2 forced fumbles and was named first-team All-Pac-12. He considered entering the 2019 NFL Draft, but ultimately decided to return for his senior season.

As a senior, he started all 14 games at left defensive end and was part of a stout defensive unit that saw 6 players selected in the 2020 NFL Draft. Anae was named preseason first-team All-Pac-12 and to the Bednarik Award watch list going into his senior year. He tied the Utah career sack record with 29.5 after posting 1.5 sacks against Colorado on November 30, 2019. Anae broke the career sack record in the 2019 Alamo Bowl, the final game of his career, with a half sack against the University of Texas. Anae finished his senior season with 14 starts, 41 tackles, 13.0 sacks, 14.0 tackles for loss and a forced fumble, while being named first-team All-Pac-12, consensus All-American selection, received the Morris Trophy as the best defensive lineman in the Pac-12 and was a finalist for the Ted Hendricks Award. He also participated in the 2020 Senior Bowl, where he had 3 sacks and received defensive MVP honors.

He finished his college career with 38 starts out of 47 games, 30 sacks (school record), 210 sack yards (school record), 41.5 tackles for loss (fourth in school history), 245 tackle for loss yards (school record) and 6 forced fumbles (tied for eighth in school history).

College statistics

Professional career

Dallas Cowboys
Anae was selected by the Dallas Cowboys in the fifth round with the 179th overall pick in the 2020 NFL Draft, after dropping because he didn't test well at the NFL Scouting Combine. As a rookie, he appeared in the first six games with minimum playing opportunities. After defensive end Randy Gregory returned from his suspension, Anae was declared inactive in nine of the last 10 contests. It was later reported in the media, that the team's defensive end depth and his struggles against the run were the reasons for his lack of playing time. He played mainly on special teams and had one defensive tackle.

On September 24, 2021, he was placed on the reserve/COVID-19 list. On October 6, 2021, he was activated from the reserve/COVID-19 list. On November 2, 2021, Anae was waived after committing a defensive offsides penalty on fourth-and-5 in the second quarter against the Minnesota Vikings, that kept a drive alive. On November 4, 2021, he was re-signed to the practice squad. He appeared in 4 games as a backup defensive end, making 2 defensive tackles.

New York Jets
On January 19, 2022, Anae signed a reserve/future contract with the New York Jets. He was waived on August 30, 2022 and signed to the practice squad the next day. He was promoted to the active roster on January 7, 2023.

Personal life
Anae's father, Brad Anae, played college football at BYU and was an honorable mention All-American in 1980 and a third-team All-America selection in 1981 and played three seasons in the United States Football League. His two uncles, Matt and Robert Anae, also played at BYU and Robert is currently the offensive coordinator at Syracuse university.

References

External links
Utah Utes bio

1998 births
Living people
People from Laie
Players of American football from Hawaii
American football defensive ends
Utah Utes football players
All-American college football players
Dallas Cowboys players
New York Jets players